Bocha may refer to:

 Bocce
 Bocha, Nepal
 The Bocha Chiefdom in Zimbabwe